Oise is a department in the north of France. It is named after the river Oise. Inhabitants of the department are called Oisiens or Isariens, after the Latin name for the river, Isara. It had a population of 829,419 in 2019.

History
Oise is one of the original 83 departments created during the French Revolution on March 4, 1790. It was created from part of the province of Île-de-France and Picardy.

After the coalition victory at Waterloo, the department was occupied by British troops between June 1815 and November 1818.

In March 2021, local Member of Parliament Olivier Dassault was killed in a plane crash.

Geography
Oise is part of the current region of Hauts-de-France and is situated 35 km north of Paris. It is surrounded by the departments of Somme, Aisne, Seine-et-Marne, Val-d'Oise, Eure, and Seine-Maritime.

Principal towns 

The most populous commune is Beauvais, the prefecture. As of 2019, there are 13 communes with more than 10,000 inhabitants. The 10 most populous communes are:

Demographics

Politics

The president of the Departmental Council is Nadège Lefebvre, elected in 2017.

Presidential elections 2nd round

Current National Assembly Representatives

Tourism
The major tourist attraction of the department is the Parc Astérix, which opened in 1989.  Other interesting sites are Beauvais Cathedral, the Chateau de Pierrefonds, restored by Viollet-le-Duc, and the art collection of the Château de Chantilly, which is one of the largest outside Paris.

Twinned county
Oise is twinned with Bedfordshire in England. It is also twinned with the Indonesian regency of Karanganyar and the Chinese provinces of Shandong and Zhejiang.

One of the villages along the river Oise is Auvers-sur-Oise, famous for having been visited by several impressionist artists. This is where Vincent van Gogh spent his last 70 days and is his and his brother Theo's resting place.

See also

Arrondissements of the Oise department
Cantons of the Oise department
Communes of the Oise department
Monument aux morts (Oise)

References

External links
  Prefecture website
  Departmental Council website
  oise directory website
  Oise Tourist Board

 
1790 establishments in France
Departments of Hauts-de-France
States and territories established in 1790